Hope Township is a civil township of Midland County in the U.S. state of Michigan. The population was 1,286 at the 2000 census.

Communities 
The Hope ZIP code, 48628, serves most of the township as well as portions of Billings Township to the north, Bentley Township to the northeast, Mills Township to the east, Lincoln Township to the south, and Edenville Township to the west. The first settlers, Orrin Maltby and Joseph Rooker settled in 1856. The first township meeting was in 1871 and a post office was established in May of the same year.

Geography

Demographics
As of the census of 2000, there were 1,286 people, 508 households, and 390 families residing in the township. The racial makeup of the township was 97.51% White, 1.01% African American, 0.23% Native American, 0.08% Asian, 0.08% Pacific Islander, 0.31% from other races, and 0.78% from two or more races. Hispanic or Latino of any race were 0.62% of the population.

There were 508 households, out of which 27.6% had children under the age of 18 living with them, 68.3% were married couples living together, 3.9% had a female householder with no husband present, and 23.2% were non-families. 19.1% of all households were made up of individuals, and 7.3% had someone living alone who was 65 years of age or older.  The average household size was 2.53 and the average family size was 2.88.

In the township the population was spread out, with 23.0% under the age of 18, 5.6% from 18 to 24, 28.2% from 25 to 44, 29.5% from 45 to 64, and 13.7% who were 65 years of age or older.  The median age was 41 years. For every 100 females, there were 106.4 males.  For every 100 females age 18 and over, there were 109.3 males.

The median income for a household in the township was $45,313, and the median income for a family was $50,365. Males had a median income of $38,125 versus $24,911 for females. The per capita income for the township was $23,660.  About 2.3% of families and 3.3% of the population were below the poverty line, including 2.4% of those under age 18 and 5.4% of those age 65 or over.

Notable people
Sara Lee, WWE Tough Enough winner (Season 6)

References

Townships in Midland County, Michigan
Townships in Michigan
1871 establishments in Michigan
Populated places established in 1871